NGC 57 is an elliptical galaxy in the constellation Pisces. It was discovered on 8 October 1784 by astronomer William Herschel.

SN 2010dq 

On June 3, 2010, Koichi Itagaki detected a magnitude 17 supernova 17" west and 1" south of the center of NGC 57 at coordinates 00 15 29.70 +17 19 41.0.

See also 
 Elliptical galaxy 
 List of NGC objects (1–1000)
 Pisces (constellation)

References

External links

 
Discovery image of SN 2010dq (2010-06-03) / Wikisky DSS2 zoom-in of same region

Elliptical galaxies
Pisces (constellation)
0057
00145
01037
17841008